Kaleb Tedla (khaleb tedll’a) (April 1918 – February 11, 2006) was a successful Eritrean business man who lived most of his life in Ethiopia. He was born in a former province  of Seraye, Eritrea, from a top-ranking  military Askari (a common name for local soldiers who served Italian colonial powers) at the end of World War I. Kaleb grew up in his early childhood in Gaza Kenisha, by then an upscale place for local Eritreans.

As young men, Kaleb and his eldest brother, Iyasu, went to a colonial boarding school directly administrated by the then imperial fascist regime of Benito Mussolini. Kaleb and some Eritreans who despised the Italians fled down south to Ethiopia.

Following the Second Italo-Ethiopian War in 1935, Kaleb's friends opted to stay at the newly conquered colonial capital Addis Ababa; Kaleb himself, however, continued his voyage to the southwestern newly Italian-designed city of Jimma in early 1939, employed under the monarchial house of the town's king Abba Jifar II's family.

Lauded for his ability as one of the most skilled auto mechanics of his age, he is well-remembered as one of the gifted business-minded maestros. Despite the political pressure by the then-Ethiopian imperial regime on native Eritreans, he found himself one of the well-known tycoons in Ethiopia.

At the brink of the forceful annexation of Eritrea by the then-emperor Haile Selassie, he was one of the main businessmen vastly engaged in the growing coffee business, which has been the main source of income for Ethiopian economy.

As an entrepreneur he diversified his scope in brewery and other sectors, which in return helped in the growth of the little Italian town, Jimma.

At 1974 with the coming of the pro-communist military junta, Derge Kaleb and other known businessmen were subjected to imprisonment. Some were put to death, taking their accumulated wealth as a sign of manipulation and accusing the wealthy class as extension of the so-called "feudal regime".

Since he was Eritrean and best friend to two of the top-ranking Eritrean-born Ethiopian Generals, General Aman Andom and General Bereket, Kaleb's case was weighed more than the any other Ethiopian, and he was accused of helping the ELF (Eritrean Liberation Front), and also alleged that he ordered the ruthless interrogations of one of his employees who stole from him more than 150,000,000 Ethiopian Birr, which was found later to be a simple fabrication by the junta's cadres.

1918 births
2006 deaths
Eritrean businesspeople
20th-century businesspeople